The 1998–99 Scottish First Division was won by Hibernian who bounced straight back up to the Scottish Premier League after relegation the previous season and finished 23 points ahead of nearest challengers Falkirk.  Hamilton Academical and Stranraer were relegated to the Second Division. In the case of Stranraer, they didn't manage to compete well enough in this division following on from their promotion a year earlier.

Stadia and locations

Table

References 

Scottish First Division seasons
Scot
1998–99 Scottish Football League